Zuid-Scharwoude (West Frisian: Sûd-Skerwou) is a town in the Dutch province of North Holland. It is located in the municipality of Dijk en Waard, about 8 km northwest of Alkmaar.

History 
The village was first mentioned in 1094 as Sudrekercha. The current name means "southern forest near Schoorl". Zuid (south) was added to distinguish from Noord-Scharwoude. Zuid-Scharwoude developed in the 11th century as a linear settlement along a dike.

The Dutch Reformed church was built in the 15th century as a replacement of a 12th century church, and renovated in 1819. In 1905, the tower collapsed and the church was shortened with a build-in tower.

Zuid-Scharwoude was home to 626 people in 1840. It was a separate municipality between 1817 and 1941, when it became a part of Langedijk. It used to be the capital of Langedijk. Since 2022 it has become part of the new municipality of Dijk en Waard.

Gallery

See also
Scharwoude, Langendijk

References

Former municipalities of North Holland
Populated places in North Holland
Geography of Dijk en Waard